The Real Macaw is a 1998 Australian adventure film written by Bruce Hancock and Matthew Perry and directed by Mario Andreacchio. It was produced and distributed by Becker Entertainment, and filmed on location in Brisbane, Queensland, Australia. The film was released on 24 September 1998 and released on VHS on 11 July 2000 by Paramount Home Video. It stars Jason Robards as Grandpa Girdis and John Goodman as the voice of Mac.

Plot
Mac, an ancient blue and gold macaw, becomes the saving grace for an elderly man threatened with a nursing home when it is discovered that the talking bird knows the whereabouts of a buried treasure from its days with a pirate. The man's grandson decides to go off on the hunt only to discover that a resort now exists where the treasure is buried.

Cast
 Jamie Croft as Sam Girdis
 Deborra-Lee Furness as Beth Girdis
 Joe Petruzzi as Rick Girdis
 John Waters as Dr. Lance Hagen
 Jason Robards as Grandpa Girdis
 John Goodman as Mac the Parrot (American Version)
 Gerry Connolly as Lou Rickets
 Robert Coleby as Mr. St. John
 Petra Yared as Kathy Girdis
 Nathan Kotzur as Scarlatta
 Kevin Hides as Business Man on Plane
 Penny Everingham as Nurse Gimlet
 Murray Shoring as Dr. Thompson
 Daniel Murphy as Pet Store Owner/Mac the Parrot (Australian Version)
 Anna-Maria La Spina as Museum Receptionist

Box office
The Real Macaw grossed $741,876 at the box office in Australia.

Reception
On Rotten Tomatoes The Real Macaw has two reviews listed: one positive; one negative.

Accolades

See also
 Cinema of Australia

References

External links
The Real Macaw at Oz Movies

Australian adventure films
1998 films
1990s adventure films
1990s children's adventure films
Parrots
Films scored by Bill Conti
Films about birds
Treasure hunt films
Films directed by Mario Andreacchio
1990s English-language films
1990s Australian films